The following is a list of awards and nominations received by Hugh Laurie.

Laurie is an English actor, comedian, singer, and producer. Throughout his career, he has received ten Primetime Emmy Award nominations for his performances in the medical drama House (2005–2011), the limited series The Night Manager (2016), and Veep (2017). He also received seven Golden Globe Award nominations winning three times, twice for Best Actor in a Television Drama Series for House and for Best Supporting Actor – Series, Miniseries or Television Film for The Night Manager. He also received nine Screen Actors Guild Award nominations winning twice for Outstanding Performance by a Male Actor in a Drama Series for his leading performance in House.

Major associations

Primetime Emmy Awards

Golden Globe Awards

Screen Actors Guild awards

Television Critics Association awards

Other awards

Annie awards

British independent film awards

People's choice awards

Satellite awards

Teen choice awards

References

Laurie, Hugh